Rudolf Knez (12 September 1944 – 5 August 2022) was a Slovenian ice hockey player. He competed in the men's tournaments at the 1968 Winter Olympics and the 1972 Winter Olympics. He died on 5 August 2022, at the age of 77.

References

1944 births
2022 deaths
Slovenian ice hockey players
Olympic ice hockey players of Yugoslavia
Ice hockey players at the 1968 Winter Olympics
Ice hockey players at the 1972 Winter Olympics
Sportspeople from Jesenice, Jesenice